Atbara Stadium is a multi-purpose stadium in Atbara, Sudan.  It is currently used mostly for football matches and is the home stadium of Amal Atbara.  The stadium has a capacity of 15,000 people.

References

Football venues in Sudan
Multi-purpose stadiums in Sudan